Lin Wenyue (born 5 September 1933) is a Chinese scholar, writer and translator from Taiwan.

Biography
Lin was born in Shanghai in 1933, with her ancestral home in Changhua County. Lin primarily studied at a Japanese school. Her grandfather, Lian Heng, was a historian, who was Vice President Lien Chan's grandfather.

In 1946, Lin went to Taiwan with her family. In 1952, Lin was accepted to National Taiwan University. After graduation, she worked in Taiwan University as a teacher. Lin married Guo Yulun in 1957 in Taiwan. She started to publish books in 1960.

In 1969, Lin went to study Japanese Literature at Kyoto University in Japan.

In 1989, Lin went to the United States and was a professor in Washington University in St. Louis.

Lin retired in 1993 and she settled in America. From 1993 to 1999, Lin was a professor at Stanford University, University of California, Berkeley and Charles University.

Works

Prose works
 Yaoyuan
 Chat
 Schoolroom In the afternoon
 Diet Diary

Biography
 Biography of Lian Heng

Translations
 The Pillow Book
 Izumi Shikibu's Diary
 The Tale of Genji
 The Tales of Ise
 Thirteen Nights

Awards
 Yaoyuan – 5th Zhongxing Literature and Art Award
 Schoolroom In the afternoon – 9th China Times Literature Award
 Chat – 14th National Literature and Art Award (1988)
 The Tale of Genji – 19th National Literature and Art Award (1994)
 Diet Diary – 3rd Taipei Literature Award

References

1933 births
National Taiwan University alumni
Kyoto University alumni
20th-century Taiwanese women writers
Republic of China translators
American people of Taiwanese descent
Living people
20th-century Chinese translators
21st-century Chinese translators
Taiwanese people from Shanghai
Lien Heng family
Academic staff of the National Taiwan University
Washington University in St. Louis faculty
Stanford University faculty
University of California, Berkeley faculty
Academic staff of Charles University